HWN may refer to:
 Harlow Town railway station, in England
 Heaven's White Noise
 Heterogeneous wireless network
 The Hurricane Watch Net
 Hwange National Park Airport, in Zimbabwe